Sport Huamanga is a Peruvian football club, playing in the city of Ayacucho, Peru.

Honours

Regional
Región V: 1
Winners (1): 2007
Runner-up (2): 2005, 2006

Región VI: 1
Winners (1): 2008

Liga Departamental de Ayacucho: 4
Winners (4): 2005, 2006, 2007, 2008

Liga Distrital de Ayacucho: 3
Winners (3): 2004, 2005, 2006

See also
List of football clubs in Peru
Peruvian football league system

Football clubs in Peru
Association football clubs established in 2002
2002 establishments in Peru